"Don't Cry" is a song by British rapper and actor Bugzy Malone and Irish singer-songwriter and musician Dermot Kennedy. It was released on 20 November 2020 as the third single from Malone's upcoming second studio album The Resurrection. The song was written by Bugzy Malone.

Background

Music video
A music video to accompany the release of "Don't Cry" was first released onto YouTube on 19 November 2020. The video was directed by Myles Whittingham. The video shows a boxing match which reflects Bugzy Malone's journey since an almost fatal motorbike crash, which happened the previous year.

Personnel
Credits adapted from Tidal.
 Rhymez – Producer
 Silkey – Producer
 Bugzy Malone – Composer, lyricist, associated performer, vocals
 Dermot Kennedy – Associated Performer, author, vocals
 Stadelta – Mastering Engineer, mixer, studio personnel

Charts

References

2020 songs
2020 singles
Dermot Kennedy songs